is a Japanese politician who served as minister of justice from October 2021 to August 2022. He is serving in the House of Representatives as a member of the Liberal Democratic Party.

Life
Furukawa was born on August 3, 1965, in Kushima, Miyazaki. His family owned a small shōchū factory and a liquor store.

He entered the La Salle Academy, and was expelled from the dormitory during middle school. After graduating from La Salle Academy High School, he entered the University of Tokyo. There, he was in the same class with Masahiko Shibayama and Takashi Yamashita.

After graduating from the University of Tokyo, he joined the Ministry of Construction in 1989.

After unsuccessful runs in 1996 and 2000, he was elected to the House of Representatives for the first time in 2003 as an independent.

References

External links 
 Official website in Japanese.

Members of the House of Representatives (Japan)
University of Tokyo alumni
Living people
1965 births
Liberal Democratic Party (Japan) politicians
21st-century Japanese politicians
Ministers of Justice of Japan